The Politburo of the 15th Congress of the All-Union Communist Party (Bolsheviks) was in session from 1927 to 1930.

Composition

Members

Candidates

References

Politburo of the Central Committee of the Communist Party of the Soviet Union members
Politburo
Politburo